Son of Perdition is the third album by American extreme metal band Wretched. It was released on March 27, 2012.

Track listing

Credits
Wretched
 Adam Cody – vocals
 John Vail – guitars, choir arrangement on "Oblivion", cello arrangement on "Dreams of Chaos" and "Decimation"
 Steven Funderburk – guitars
 Andrew Grevey – bass
 Marshall Wieczorek – drums, percussion, engineering

Additional musicians
 Jessica Gibbons – choir on "Oblivion"
 Samantha Ward – choir on "Oblivion"
 Lisa Grant – choir on "Oblivion"
 Joanna Harrison – choir on "Oblivion"
 Laura Simpson – choir on "Oblivion"
 Andrew Bozard – choir on "Oblivion"
 Philip Ashley – choir on "Oblivion"
 Shaquile Hester – choir on "Oblivion"
 Zach Burrage-Goodwin – choir on "Oblivion"
 Eugene Ernest Rowell IV – choir on "Oblivion"
 Patrick Dover – choir on "Oblivion"
 Dusan Vukajlovic – cello on "Dreams of Chaos" and "Decimation"
 Mark Husey – organ on "Oblivion"

Production
 Jamie King – engineering, mixing, mastering
 Par Olofsson – artwork
 Doublej – layout

References

2012 albums
Wretched (metal band) albums
Victory Records albums
Albums with cover art by Pär Olofsson